The April Revolution, also known as the Yellow Revolution, was a campaign initiated by Antonio Guzmán Blanco with leaders of the Venezuelan Federal War, including his most adept followers, Joaquín Crespo and Francisco Linares Alcántara. Coming from Curaçao and bringing material to quickly rearm the rebel army, Guzmán and his army landed in Curamichate, near La Vela de Coro, on 14 February 1870. By 27 April of the same year, after three days of combat, they enter Caracas triumphantly acclaimed by the people dissatisfied with the government of José Ruperto Monagas; the city had between 1,600 and 2,000 defenders, most of them armed residents. General Monagas signed the surrender of the government and began the long term of Antonio Guzmán Blanco, a period known as Yellow Liberalism. Guzmán Blanco marches with six thousand soldiers on Apure, pacifying it at the beginning of 1871 and assuring his power.

References

Bibliography 

 Lucca, Rafael Arráiz (mayo de 2007). «6».  En Fanuel Hanán Díaz; Lisbeth Cabezas, ed. Historia Contemporánea de Venezuela. Primer año del ciclo diversificado de la Educación Media. (1era edición). Caracas: Larense. pp. 94-95;101.
 Esteves González, Edgar (2006). Las Guerras de Los Caudillos. Caracas: El Nacional. .
 Dixon, Jeffrey S. & Meredith Reid Sarkees (2015). A Guide to Intra-state Wars: An Examination of Civil, Regional, and Intercommunal Wars, 1816–2014. CQ Press. .

Wars involving Venezuela
1870s in Venezuela